Vichit Praianan (born 16 October 1951) is a Thai boxer. He competed in the men's lightweight event at the 1972 Summer Olympics. At the 1972 Summer Olympics, he lost to James Busceme of the United States.

References

1951 births
Living people
Vichit Praianan
Vichit Praianan
Boxers at the 1972 Summer Olympics
Place of birth missing (living people)
Asian Games medalists in boxing
Boxers at the 1978 Asian Games
Vichit Praianan
Medalists at the 1978 Asian Games
Lightweight boxers
Vichit Praianan